James Baxter (born 24 May 1967) is a British character animator. He was first known for his work on several Walt Disney Animation Studios films, including various characters in Who Framed Roger Rabbit, Belle in Beauty and the Beast, Rafiki in The Lion King, and Quasimodo in The Hunchback of Notre Dame.

After The Hunchback of Notre Dame, Baxter moved over to DreamWorks Animation working on films such as The Prince of Egypt, The Road to El Dorado, Spirit: Stallion of the Cimarron, Shrek 2 and Madagascar. Early in 2005, Baxter left DreamWorks and set out on his own as an independent animator. He became the head of his own studio, James Baxter Animation in Pasadena, California where he has directed the animation for the 2007 film Enchanted and the opening credits to DreamWorks' Kung Fu Panda. He received an Annie Award for working on Kung Fu Panda. In 2008, Baxter closed his studio and returned to DreamWorks as a supervising animator. While at DreamWorks, Baxter worked on films including Monsters vs. Aliens, How to Train Your Dragon, and The Croods. In 2017, Baxter left DreamWorks once again and went to work for Netflix.

In May 2013, Baxter was a guest animator for an episode of the fifth season of Adventure Time entitled "James Baxter the Horse". The episode's story focused on the lead characters trying to emulate a horse who can cheer everyone up by neighing his name (James Baxter) and balancing on a beach ball. Both the horse's animation and voice were provided by Baxter. The episode's title card features a drawing of the horse drawing a horse on a beach ball, while sitting at an animation table. A second episode focusing on the character's origins, "Horse and Ball", aired during the show's eighth season with Baxter once again animating and voicing the character.

In 2018, Baxter, along with fellow animators Stephen Hillenburg (months before his death), Amanda Forbis, and Wendy Tilby won the Winsor McCay Award at the 2018 Annie Awards.

Filmography

References

External links 

James Baxter reveals the secrets of enchanting character animation
James Baxter's visit to CalArt's Character Animation Program (Spring '06)

1967 births
Living people
Alumni of Middlesex University
Annie Award winners
Cartoon Network Studios people
Netflix people
DreamWorks Animation people
English animators
People educated at Bishop's Stortford College
Film people from Bristol
Walt Disney Animation Studios people